In transport, a trace is one of two, or more, straps, ropes or chains by which a carriage or wagon, or the like, is drawn by a harness horse or other draft animal. The once popular idiom: "kick over the traces" is derived from a frisky or frightened animal kicking one or both feet outside a trace. Unable to understand the entanglement, the animal may become wildly confused and out of control, possibly even breaking away. Hence, to "kick over the traces", when referring to a person, means to become wild and uncontrollable, or to abandon constraint.

See also
Horse harness
Horse tack

Horse harness